Van Broeckhoven is a surname. Notable people with the surname include:

Christine Van Broeckhoven (born 1953), Belgian scientist and academic
Steven Van Broeckhoven (born 1985), Belgian windsurfer
Wiet Van Broeckhoven (1949-2019), Belgian radio presenter and author.

de Brouchoven 

Noble Flemish House of de Brouchoven de Bergheyck
 Jean de Brouchoven, 2nd Count of Bergeyck
 Hyacinthe-Marie de Brouchoven
 Louis de Brouchoven de Bergeyck

Surnames of Dutch origin